Maria Borounov (born 14 May 1982) is an Australian former competitive ice dancer. Competing with her husband, Evgueni Borounov, she became the 2006–2007 Australian national champion and competed at six Four Continents Championships.

Personal life 
Maria Borounov was born on 14 May 1982 in Perth, Western Australia. She studied justice and business law at university. She met Evgueni Borounov in 2000 and married him in 2002.

Career 
Maria Borounov began learning to skate in 1993. At age 16, she sustained a knee injury, resulting in dislocation of the patella and extensive tissue damage. She underwent surgery and returned to the ice a year later.

In 2002, she collided with a fellow skater, resulting in another knee injury, which led her to switch from singles to ice dancing. She teamed up with her husband, Evgueni Borounov, an experienced ice dancer from Russia, and completed all of her dance tests in a year.

During their career, the Borounovs trained in Perth, Western Australia, and Moscow, Russia. They began traveling to Russia in 2005, to train under Elena Kustarova and Svetlana Alexeeva. Their first major international was the 2006 Four Continents Championships, where they placed 14th. They won the Australian national title in the 2006–2007 season and took the bronze medal at the 2007 NRW Trophy.

They competed at six consecutive Four Continents, from 2006 to 2011. Kustarova and Alexeeva served as their coaches until the end of the 2008–2009 season. The Borounovs retired from competition in 2011.

Maria Borounov is a coach at Cockburn Ice Arena in Perth.

Programs 
(with Evgueni Borounov)

Competitive highlights
(with Evgueni Borounov)

References

External links 

 

Australian female ice dancers
1982 births
Living people
Sportswomen from Western Australia
Sportspeople from Perth, Western Australia
21st-century Australian dancers